This is a timeline documenting the events of heavy metal in the year 1984.

Events
October 23 — A debate over heavy metal music occurs on SVT's Svar direkt between Anders Tegnér and Siewert Öholm.

Newly formed bands
 Agent Steel
Angel Dust 
 Annihilator
 Atheist
Barren Cross
The Black Crowes
Blasphemy 
 Blind Guardian  (under the name "Lucifer's Heritage" until 1988)
Bloodgood
 Candlemass
 Celtic Frost
Chastain 
Chrome Molly
Concrete Sox 
Cranium  
The Crucified 
Cryptic Slaughter
Dead End
Deathrow
Deceased 
Detente 
Deviated Instinct
Dirty Looks
Domine 
Enuff Z'Nuff
 Eudoxis
Executioner
Faith 
Fantom Warior
The Firm
FM
Frehley's Comet
The Front
Grinder  
Gwar  
Heathen
Héroes del Silencio
Hellbastard
 Helloween
Heretic 
Hirax
Iced Earth
Jack Starr's Burning Starr
Jesters of Destiny
 Keel
 King Kobra
KMFDM
Korrozia Metalla
Krabathor
Kraken
Leeway 
 Living Colour
Lobotomia 
Los Cycos
Ludichrist
Tony MacAlpine
Massacre 
 Mayhem
Mefisto 
Messiah 
Mistrust
Morbid Saint
Mordred 
Necrodeath
 Nepal
 Nuclear Assault
Obituary 
Phenomena
Piledriver  
Powermad 
Praxis
 Primus
The Quireboys
Racer X 
 Rage (under the name "Avenger" until 1986)
Repulsion
Sacrilege
 Sadus
 Sepultura
Slaughter 
 Soundgarden
Steel Prophet
 Stratovarius
Tangier
Thanatos 
 Uncle Slam (known as The Brood until 1987)
Vendetta 
Victory 
Vinnie Vincent Invasion
Warfaze
 Warrant
 Whiplash
Wolfsbane 
Xentrix

Reformed bands
 Deep Purple

Albums & EPs

 Lee Aaron - Metal Queen
 AC/DC - '74 Jailbreak (EP)
 Alcatrazz - Live Sentence (live)
 Angeles del Infierno - Pacto con el Diablo
 The Angels, aka Angel City - Two Minute Warning
 Anthrax - Fistful of Metal
 Antix - Get Up, Get Happy (EP)
 April Wine - Animal Grace
 Armed Forces - Let There Be Metal (EP)
 Armored Saint - March of the Saint
 ATC - Cut in Ice
 Atlain - Living in the Dark
 Attack - Danger in the Air  
 Attentat Rock – Le Gang des Saigneurs
 Autograph - Sign In Please
 Avenger (UK) - Blood Sports
 Axe Victims - Another Victim
 Axe Witch - Visions of the Past
 Baby Tuckoo - First Born
 Backwater - Revelation
 Banzai - Duro y Potente
 Barón Rojo - Barón Al Rojo Vivo (live)
 Bathory - Bathory
 Battleaxe - Power from the Universe
 Black Death - Black Death
 Black Lace - Unlaced
 Black 'n Blue - Black 'n Blue
 The Black Riders - The Chosen Few
 Black Rose - Boys Will Be Boys
 Black Rose - Black Rose (EP)
 Black Tears – Child of the Storm
 Blackout - Evil Game
 Blade Runner – Hunted
 Blaspheme – Blaspheme
 Bloody Six - In the Name of Blood
 Bon Jovi - Bon Jovi
 Boss - Step on It
 Brainfever – Capture the Night
 Brocas Helm - Into Battle
 Bronz – Taken by Storm
 Brooklyn Brats - Brooklyn Brats (EP)
 Buster Brown – Loud and Clear
 Buzzard (Bel) - Gambler
 Cacumen - Down to Hell
 Celtic Frost - Morbid Tales
 Chariot - The Warrior 
 Charon – Charon
 Chateaux - Fire Power
 Childhood's End - Childhood's End (EP)
 Chinawite - Run for Cover
 Cirith Ungol - King of the Dead
 Cloven Hoof - Cloven Hoof
 Corrosion of Conformity - Eye for an Eye
 Crisis - Armed to the Teeth (EP)
 Crossfire - See You in Hell 
 Crown - Red Zone
 Crown - All That Rock & Roll Music
 Crystal Pride – Knocked Out (EP)
 Crystal Pride  – Crystal Pride
 The Cult - Dreamtime
 Cutty Sark - Die Tonight
 Dark Age (US) - Dark Age (EP)
 Dark Heart - Shadows of the Night
 Dark Wizard - Devil's Victim (EP)
 Darxon – Killed in Action
 D.D.T. – Let The Screw...Turn You On (EP)
 Deep Purple - Perfect Strangers
 Demon - Wonderland (EP)
 Demon Eyes - Rites of Chaos
 Denigh – Fire from the Sky
 Der Kaiser – Vautours
 Destruction - Sentence of Death (EP)
 Di'Anno - Di'Anno
 Dio - The Last in Line
 Divine Rite - First Rite
 Dokken - Tooth and Nail
 Electric Eels (CA) - Electric Eels
 Elessar - Defy the King (EP)
 Earthshaker - Fugitive
 Earthshaker - Midnight Flight
 Eric Steel - Eric Steel
 Europe - Wings of Tomorrow
 Evil - Evil's Message (EP)
 Exciter - Violence & Force
 Explorer - Exploding
 Exxplorer - Symphonies of Steel
 Ezy Meat - Not for Wimps
 Fact – As a Matter of Fact
 Faithful Breath - Gold 'n' Glory
 Fastway - All Fired Up
 Fates Warning - Night on Bröcken
 First Strike – Rock of Offense
 Fisc - Tracker
 FN Guns - Nightmare
 Force – Set Me Free
 Flatbacker - Minagoroshi
 Lita Ford - Dancin' on the Edge
 Rhett Forrester - Gone with the Wind
 Gilgamesj - Take One (EP)
 Glory Bells - Century Rendezvous
 Gotham City - The Unknown 
 Grave Digger - Heavy Metal Breakdown
 Graven Image - People in Hell Want Ice Water (EP)
 Gravestone – Victim of Chains
 Great White - Great White
 Griffin - Flight of the Griffin
 Sammy Hagar - VOA
 Hammerhead - Heart Made of Steel (EP)
 Hammers Rule - Show No Mercy
 Hanoi Rocks - All Those Waisted Years (live)
 Hanoi Rocks - Two Steps from the Move
 Hardline (Nor) - Hardline
 Hardware - Common Time Heroes
 Hawaii - Loud, Wild and Heavy (EP)
 Hazzard - Hazzard
 H-Bomb - Attaque
 Headstone - Burning Ambition
 Helix - Walkin' the Razor's Edge
 Hellanbach - The Big H
 Hellhammer - Apocalyptic Raids (EP)
 Hellion (NY) - Dangerous Maneuvers
 Helstar - Burning Star
 Hexx - No Escape
 Highway Chile - For the Wild and Lonely (EP)
 Hiroshima – Taste of Death
 Hocculta – Warning Games
 Holland (UK) – Early Warning
 Holocaust - No Man's Land
 Icon - Icon
 Incubus (UK) - To the Devil a Daughter
 Ironcross - Steel Warrior
 Iron Maiden - Powerslave
 Jag Panzer - Ample Destruction
 Jaguar - This Time
 Albert Järvinen Band – Countdown (EP)
 Judas Priest - Defenders of the Faith
 Keel - Lay Down the Law
 Kick Axe - Vices
 Killer (Swi) - Stronger Than Ever
 Killer (Bel) - Shock Waves
 KISS - Animalize
 Krokus - The Blitz
 Lȧȧz Rockit - City's Gonna Burn
 Lazy - Creature
 Leatherwolf - Leatherwolf (EP)
 Le Griffe - Breaking Strain (EP)
 Legs Diamond - Out on Bail
 Limelight - Ashes to Ashes, aka Limelight (1980)
 Living Death - Vengeance of Hell 
 Lizzy Borden - Give 'Em the Axe (EP)
 Loudness - Disillusion
 Madam X - We Reserve the Right
 Mad Axeman - Mad Axeman
 Mad Max - Rollin' Thunder
 Madd Hatter - Madd Hatter
 Madison - Diamond Mistress
 Maineeaxe - Shout It Out
 Yngwie Malmsteen - Rising Force
 Maltese Falcon – Metal Rush
 Mama's Boys - Mama's Boys
 Manowar - Hail to England
 Manowar - Sign of the Hammer
 Marseille – Touch the Night
 Mass (Ger) - War Law
 McCoy – Think Hard
 Medieval Steel - Medieval Steel (EP)
 Mercy - Mercy
 Mercyful Fate - Don't Break the Oath
 Messiah (US) - Final Warning
 Messiah Prophet - Rock the Flock
 Metal Church - Metal Church
 Metal Massacre - Metal Massacre V (Compilation, various artists)
 Metallica - Ride the Lightning
 Millennium - Millennium
 Gary Moore - We Want Moore! (live)
 Motörhead - No Remorse (comp)
 MSG - Rock Will Never Die (live)
 Nemesis - The Day of Retribution (EP)
 Mystery Blue - Mystery Blue
 New York – Carry the Torch (EP)
 Nightmare – Waiting for the Twilight
 Nightwing – My Kingdom Come 
 Obsession - Marshall Law (EP)
 Obús - El Que Más
 Omen - Battle Cry
 Ostrogoth - Ecstasy and Danger
 Overdrive - Swords and Axes
 Overkill - Overkill (EP)
 Oz - III Warning
 Pantera - Projects in the Jungle
 Parasite - Parasite EP 
 Persian Risk – Too Different (EP)
 Pet Hate – The Bride Wore Red
 Phenomena – Phenomena
 Philadelphia - Tell the Truth...
 Picture - Traitor
 Piledriver - Metal Inquisition
 Pretty Maids - Red Hot and Heavy
 Prophecy - Prophecy
 Proud - Fire Breaks the Dawn
 Q5 - Steel the Light
 Queen - The Works
 Queensrÿche - The Warning
 Quiet Riot - Condition Critical
 Rail - Rail (EP)
 Railway - Railway
 Rapid Tears - Cry for Mercy (EP)
 Ratt - Out of the Cellar
 Raven - Live at the Inferno (live)
 Ravens - Get It in Your Head
 Razor - Armed & Dangerous (EP)
 Reckless - Heart of Steel
 Restless (Ger) - Heartattack
 Rising Power - Power for the People
 The Rods - Let Them Eat Metal
 Rosa Negra (Spain) - Rosa Negra
 Rose Bayonet - Leather and Chains
 Rose Tattoo - Southern Stars
 Ruffkut - Fight for the Right (EP)
 Running Wild - Gates to Purgatory
 Rush - Grace Under Pressure
 Ruthless - Metal Without Mercy (EP)
 S.A.D.O. - Shout!
 Sacred Rite - Sacred Rite
 Sad Iron - Total Damnation
 Saint - Warriors of the Son (EP)
 Saint Vitus - Saint Vitus
 Samain - Vibrations of Doom
 Sam Thunder - Manoeuvres 
 Samurai – Sacred Blade
 Santers – Guitar Alley
 Saracen – Change of Heart
 Satan Jokers - Trop Fou Pour Toi
 Samson - Don't Get Mad, Get Even
 Savage – We Got the Edge (EP)
 Saxon - Crusader
 Scorpions - Love at First Sting
 Shire - Shire (EP)
 Shok Paris - Go for the Throat
 Silver Mountain - Universe
 Sinister Angel - Sinister Angel (EP)
 Sinner - Danger Zone
 Six Feet Under (Swe) - Eruption
 Six Point Six - Fallen Angel
 Slayer - Haunting the Chapel (EP)
 Slayer - Live Undead (live)
 Smack - Smack On You
 Sortilège - Métamorphose
 Sound Barrier - Born to Rock (EP)
 Spartan Warrior - Spartan Warrior
 Spellbound - Breaking the Spell
 Spinal Tap - This Is Spinal Tap
 Splitcrow - Rockstorm
 Jack Starr - Out of the Darkness
 Steeler (Ger) - Steeler
 Steelover - Glove Me
 Steeltower - Night of the Dog
 The Sterling Cooke Force – Full Force
 Stone Fury - Burns Like a Star
 Stormwitch - Walpurgis Night
 Stratus – Throwing Shapes
 Street Fighter - Shoot You Down
 Strike (US) – Strike (EP)
 Strike (Swe) – Strike (EP)
 Strike Force - Strike Force
 Stryper - The Yellow and Black Attack
 Stygian Shore - Stygian Shore (EP)
 Surrender - Surrender
 Swift Kick - Long Live Rock (EP)
 Syar - Death Before Dishonour
 Syron Vanes – Bringer of Evil
 Taist of Iron - Resurrection
 Talon - Neutralized
 Tank - Honour & Blood
 Teeze (PA) - Teeze 
 Third Stage Alert - Third Stage Alert (EP)
 Thrust - Fist Held High
 Thunder (Ger) - All I Want
 Thundercraaft - Fighting for Survival
 Thunderstick – Beauty and the Beasts
 TKO - In Your Face
 TNT (Ger) - Deflorator
 TNT – TNT (EP)
 TNT - Knights of the New Thunder
 Tokyo Blade - Night of the Blade
 Tokyo Blade - Midnight Rendezvous (EP)
 Torch - Bad Girls (EP)
 Torch - Electrikiss
 Bernie Tormé  – Live
 Touchdown – Don't Look Down
 Touched – Back Alley Vices
 Trauma - Scratch and Scream
 Triumph - Thunder Seven
 Trouble - Psalm 9
 Trouble - Assassin (EP)
 Trust - Man's Trap
 T.T. Quick - TT Quick (EP)
 Twisted Sister - Stay Hungry
 220 Volt - Powergames
 Tyran' Pace - Eye to Eye
 Tyrant (Ger) - Mean Machine
 Tysondog - Beware of the Dog
 Tyton - Castle Donington
 Underdog - Rabies in Town
 Upper Echelon - Surface Tension (EP)
 Steve Vai - Flex-Able
 Valhalla (US) - Valhalla (EP)
 Vanadium - Game Over
 Van Halen - 1984
 Vengeance (Hol) - Vengeance
 Venom - At War with Satan
 Vice (CA) - Vice (EP)
 Vigilants – Run for Cover
 Virgin - Virgin
 Viva - Apocalypse
 Voivod - War and Pain
 Vow Wow - Beat of Metal Motion 
 Vulcain - Rock'n'Roll Secours
 Warfare - Pure Filth
 Warhead (Bel) - Speedway
 Warlock - Burning the Witches
 Warlord - Lost and Lonely Days (EP)
 Warlord - And the Cannons of Destruction Have Begun...
 Warning - Metamorphose
 Warriors - Warriors
 W.A.S.P. - W.A.S.P.
 Wasted - Halloween... the Night Of
 Waysted - Waysted (EP)
 White Wolf - Standing Alone
 Whitesnake - Slide It In
 Wild Dogs - Man's Best Friend
 Wildfire - Summer Lightning
 Winterkat – The Struggle (EP)
 Witch - The Hex Is On (EP)
 Witch Cross - Fit for Fight
 Witchfynde - Lords of Sin & Anthems live (EP) 
 Witchkiller - Day of the Saxons (EP)
 Wizz - Crazy Games
 Wolf - Edge of the World
 Wendy O. Williams - WOW
 Wrathchild (UK) - Stakk Attakk
 Wyzard - Knights of Metal (EP)
 Xcursion - Ready to Roll
 Y&T - In Rock We Trust
 Zebra - No Tellin' Lies
 Znowhite - All Hail to Thee (EP)

References

Events
 Def Leppard's drummer Rick Allen loses his left arm in a car accident on December 31.
 Deep Purple reunite.
 Hanoi Rocks drummer Razzle is killed in an automobile accident in early December. The driver of the car is Vince Neil of Mötley Crüe.
 The debut albums of both Saint Vitus (Saint Vitus) and Trouble (Psalm 9) are released.
 This is Spinal Tap, a cult mockumentary directed by Rob Reiner about the semi-fictional band Spinal Tap, is released.

1980s in heavy metal music
Metal